Benjamin Grosvenor D.D. (also Gravenor or Gravener; 1676–1758) was an English dissenting minister.

Life
He was born in London on 1 January 1676; his father, Charles Gravener, a prosperous upholsterer, at the Black Swan, Watling Street, became financially straitened in later life, and was supported by his son, who altered the spelling of his name (in 1710) to Gravenor, and then to Grosvenor (first used 1712, but not finally adopted till 1716). He was early impressed by a sermon at Gravel Lane, Southwark;  baptised at 14 by Benjamin Keach, he was admitted to his Particular Baptist congregation in Goat Yard Passage, Horselydown. Keach then encouraged him to enter the ministry.

In 1693 Gravener was placed at Attercliffe Academy under Timothy Jollie; while there, Grosvenor became a presbyterian, particularly as regards ordination. Returning to London in 1695 he studied under private tutors, and learned Hebrew from Cappel, a Huguenot refugee. He was at length dismissed from membership of his Baptist church. In 1699 he was examined and licensed by seven presbyterian ministers, including Robert Fleming the younger, and became assistant to Joshua Oldfield., at Globe Alley, Maid Lane, Southwark. In 1700 he was a candidate for the succession to Matthew Mead, in the Independent congregation at Stepney, but his excommunication by the Baptists may have affected his chances.

In 1702 a Sunday evening lecture for young men was started at the Old Jewry meeting-house, Gravener and Samuel Rosewell being appointed lecturers. His popularity as a preacher increased, and on the death of Samuel Slater (24 May 1704) he was chosen pastor of the presbyterian congregation in Crosby Square. Here he was ordained on 11 July 1704. His congregation grew in importance, and was successful in raising funds. His assistants included (1705–8) Samuel Wright; (1708–14) John Barker; (1715–26) Clerk Oldisworth, and lastly (1726–49) Edmund Calamy IV.

Grosvenor resigned the Old Jewry lectureship soon after his appointment at Crosby Square. He was for some years one of the preachers of the Friday evening lecture at the Weigh House, begun (1707) by Thomas Bradbury In 1716 he succeeded Robert Fleming as a preacher of the "merchants' lecture" on Tuesday mornings at Salters' Hall.

In 1723 Grosvenor was elected a trustee of Dr. Williams's foundations. An operation for the removal of the uvula in 1726 somewhat affected his pronunciation. On 29 May 1730 the university of Edinburgh made him D.D. At Salters' Hall he lectured against popery in 1735, taking persecution as his theme; and he was active in the Old Whig, run 1735–8 by Benjamin Avery. In 1749 he resigned his congregation and his lectureship.

Grosvenor's religious position was one of mutual toleration; in his own theology he remained a moderate Calvinist. He died on 27 August 1758, and was buried in Bunhill Fields; his funeral sermon was preached by John Barker. He left a bequest to the Presbyterian Fund, and his library to Warrington Academy.

Works
In 1716 Grosvenor was concerned in the periodic issue of the Occasional Papers, known also as the "Bagweell" papers; the first on "Bigotry" was by Grosvenor. This serial continued till 1719, and was influential on the subject of religious liberty, and with the non-subscribing majority at Salters' Hall in 1719. Only one of the eight members of the "Bagweell" fraternity, Jabez Earle, was a subscriber there, another, Joshua Bayes, remaining neutral. Grosvenor is said to have drawn up the Authentick Account (1719) of the Salters' Hall proceedings, the first of the many pamphlets issued by the non-subscribing ministers, with a list of names.

Of Grosvenor's other publications, Walter Wilson enumerated 27, most of them single sermons, including funeral sermons. Among them were:

 A Confession of Faith, 1704 (at his ordination). 
 The Temper of Jesus, 1712, (sermon on Luke xxiv. 47). 
 Observations on Sudden Death, 1720.
 The Mourner, 1731,; 18th edition, 1804. 
 Health, an Essay on its Nature, 1716, 2nd edition, 1748.

His Sermons, now first collected in a volume (1809) were edited by John Davies, with preface by David Bogue.

Family
By his first marriage (1703) to Mary (died November 1707), daughter of Captain Henry South of Bethnal Green, a lady with a fortune, Grosvenor had a son, Benjamin South Grosvenor, who died many years before his father, and a daughter, who died in infancy. By his second marriage (1712) to Elizabeth Prince he had four sons; only the youngest survived him.

Notes

 
Attribution
 

1676 births
1758 deaths
English Presbyterians
English writers
Burials at Bunhill Fields